Kamerra Franklin (born June 7, 1987), known professionally as Kam Franklin, is an American singer-songwriter, performance artist, activist, writer and orator. She is the known as the lead singer for the Houston Soul group, The Suffers. She began her career as a backing vocalist and dancer, and has toured with Jim James and the Very Best.

Background
Franklin is known for her soulful mezzo-soprano vocals, as well as her collaborations with artists of many different genres, including Houston rappers Z-Ro and Fat Tony (rapper), Americana-rocker Matthew Logan Vasquez of Delta Spirit , and famed drummer Chris Tsagakis of RX Bandits and The Sound of Animals Fighting.

Career

2008–2017: Background career
Franklin was nominated for the 2008, 2009, and 2011 Houston Press Music Award for Best Female Vocalist. Franklin finally won the award in 2012, and again in 2014. Her band, The Suffers, took home The 2012 Houston Press music award for "Best New Act" and Best Reggae/Ska/Dub. Franklin won 2014 and 2015 Houston Press Music Award for Local Musician of the Year.

Franklin was featured in a national advertising campaign for ModCloth and has been featured in a BuzzFeed article on fashion for plus-sized women.

Franklin was in Houston when Hurricane Harvey hit in 2017 and gave an account of it to the Texas Monthly newspaper.

Influences
Her primary musical influences are drawn from soul, country, gospel, and reggae music.

Appearances
On August 28, 2016, she performed lead vocals on "I Against I" during the 2016 Afropunk Festival Power Jam alongside Bad Brains, Living Colour, and Fishbone. She has performed with the Suffers on the Late Show with David Letterman, The Daily Show and Jimmy Kimmel Live!. She sang the National Anthem before a Houston Astros game at Minute Maid Park in August 2017.

Critical reception
Franklin is often praised for her "massive voice". The Edmonton Journal applauded her "vibrant grooves and emphatic vocal declarations", while 303 Magazine referred to her "highly personal style". The Seattle Weekly called her "the epitome of a powerhouse vocalist". The Idaho Statesman called her the band's "powerhouse singer". JamBase said that Franklin and her band had become "WXPN Fan darlings". Jewelry designer Jessie Dugan said that Franklin is the "contemporary vision of rockstar royalty in a world where women reign". Houston Public Media stated that "the Suffers are fantastic, and everybody wants lead singer Kam Franklin to be their big sis/best friend". The Houstonia magazine called her a "burgeoning Houston style icon" with "engaging, high-energy style". CultureMap.com said "While rocketing to fame, Franklin has become the band's style icon by pairing colorful dresses with hip cowboy boots and funky jewelry". In a live concert review, the Houston Press said "The crowd roared with Franklin extra wispy, almost ready to let her arms and joints do all the talking for her". Describing a duet with Clay Melton, Broadway World said: "Kam's soulful, sexy tones embellish the more raspy masculine voice of Clay Melton and together they lay down a track that begs a closer listen." The New Orleans' Times-Picayune said "Singer Kam Franklin has enough soul to melt away the decades between the band's source material and today." The San Diego Reader talked about her "sonic gravity".

The Austin American-Statesman wrote: "Houston’s diversity and internationalism is reflected in my favorite H-Town bands. The Suffers, fronted by vocal powerhouse Kam Franklin, blend reggae, Mexican influences and hints of bayou Cajun sounds into a mix they call Gulf Coast soul. Khruangbin mixes surf pop and psychedelic sounds with Thai funk of the 1960s."

Discography

Solo Studio albums
(2008) – Bamitskam (EP)
(2018) – Nu Metals (EP)

The Suffers
(2013) "Slow it Down" b/w "Step Aside" (single)
(2014) "Make Some Room" (EP)
(2016) The Suffers (album)
(2018) "Everything Here" (album)

Other appearances
2009 – Nick Gaitan and The Umbrella Man – Self Titled
2010 – RABDARGAB – Fat Tony (rapper) ("Not Now")
2010 – Horse shoes and Hand Grenades – Nosaprise
2011 – SCREWDARGAB Chopped-Up, Not Slopped Up by OG RON C – Fat Tony (rapper) ("Not Now")
2011 – Disaster – Chris Tsagakis
2011 – Revelator – Sideshow Tramps ("Revelator")
2012 – 24KT GOLD – DIRTY AND NASTY Featuring Hollywood Floss
2016 – Tomorrow Never Comes – Funk in the Trunk Featuring Neko
2017 – Matthew Logan Vasquez – "Same"
2017 - "Once Upon A Time" - with Scarface (rapper) and Starlito
2018 – Z-ro – "Hi Hater"
2018 – La Mafia – "Enamorada"
2021 - Har Mar Superstar - "Another Century"

Filmography

Award references

References

External links

Kam Franklin Official Website

1987 births
American mezzo-sopranos
Songwriters from Texas
Southern hip hop musicians
Texas Southern University alumni
Living people
21st-century American singers
21st-century American women singers